John Shirley (born February 10, 1953) is an American writer, primarily of fantasy, science fiction, dark street fiction, westerns, and songwriting. He has also written one historical novel, a western about Wyatt Earp, Wyatt in Wichita, and one non-fiction book, Gurdjieff: An Introduction to His Life and Ideas. Shirley has written novels, short stories, TV scripts and screenplays—including The Crow—and has published over 84 books including 10 short-story collections. As a musician, Shirley has fronted his own bands and written lyrics for Blue Öyster Cult and others. His newest novels are Stormland and Axle Bust Creek.

Biography
John Shirley was born in Houston, Texas and grew up largely in the vicinity of Portland, Oregon. His earliest novels were Transmaniacon and Dracula in Love for Zebra Books, and City Come A-Walkin, a proto-cyberpunk novel, for Delacorte. He also wrote the A Song Called Youth cyberpunk trilogy for Warner Books, re-released as an omnibus in 2012 by Prime Books. 2012 saw his noir-flavored novel of apocalypse, Everything Is Broken released by Prime Books. In 2013 PM Press released Shirley's New Taboos. In October 2013 HarperCollins/Witness released his novel about Conan Doyle in the afterlife,  Doyle After Death; Skyhorse Publications brought out his historical novel about Wyatt Earp, Wyatt in Wichita, in August 2014. Shirley's collaboration with rock musician Mark Tremonti, an adaptation of Tremonti's rock opera A DYING MACHINE, was completed in June 2018.

Besides having written numerous books Shirley was lead singer of the punk band Sado-Nation, in 1978-79; he was lead singer of the post-punk funk-rock band Obsession, on Celluloid Records, while living in New York City and Paris, France, in the 1980s, and was later in the band the Panther Moderns. He is currently performing with The Screaming Geezers. Shirley has also written 23 song lyrics recorded by Blue Öyster Cult.

Shirley's one nonfiction book is Gurdjieff: An Introduction to His Life and Ideas (Penguin/Tarcher). He currently lives in the Vancouver Washington area with his wife, Micky Shirley. Shirley has three adult sons, twins Byron and Perry and their younger brother Julian, who also goes by "Juji". Byron is a yacht captain and yacht broker; Perry is a  teacher and artist.  Julian is a Bay Area-based underground rapper and producer of hip-hop, trap, chiptune and various other electronic music genres, as well as a computer security professional under the alias "DonJuji".

Career

Shirley is known for his cyberpunk science fiction novels, such as the A Song Called Youth trilogy, City Come A-Walkin''' and Black Glass, as well as his suspense (as in his novels Spider Moon and The Brigade), horror novels and stories (e.g., Demons and Crawlers and the story collection Black Butterflies) and horror film work. The A Song Called Youth cyberpunk trilogy, Eclipse, Eclipse Penumbra, and Eclipse Corona, has been slated for a new edition by Dover Books in 2017.  His tie-in novels include the best-seller BioShock: Rapture. His best known script work is the film The Crow, for which he was the initial writer, before David Schow reworked the script.  He also wrote scripts for Deep Space Nine and Poltergeist: The Legacy. He was nominated for an Emmy in the Prime Time Animation category for an episode of Teenage Mutant Ninja Turtles.

Authors David Agranoff and Nancy Collins and editor/critic Paula Guran cite his intense, expressionistic early horror novels, such as Dracula in Love and Cellars as an influence on the splatterpunk movement in horror, and the subsequent "bizarro" movement. Appreciation of John Shirley as an author of dark fiction was amplified by a January 2008 The New York Times review, by critic Terrence Rafferty, of Shirley's story-collection Living Shadows which said in part:

Shirley's cyberpunk novels are City Come A-Walkin, the A Song Called Youth trilogy and Stormland. Avant-slipstream critic Larry McCaffery called him "a postmodern Edgar Allan Poe." Bruce Sterling has cited Shirley's early story collection Heatseeker as being a seminal cyberpunk work in itself. Several stories in Heatseeker were particularly seminal, including Sleepwalkers, which, in just one example, probably provided the inspiration for William Gibson's "meat puppets" in Neuromancer. Gibson acknowledged Shirley's influence in an introduction to Shirley's City Come A-Walkin. Shirley's story collection, made up of increasingly bizarre stories, the whimsically titled Really, Really, Really, Really Weird Stories has developed a cult status.

William Gibson, the author of Neuromancer, collaborated with Shirley on short stories—as did fellow cyberpunks Bruce Sterling and Rudy Rucker. Shirley's lyricism, wealth of ideas and imagination, crossover pioneering, and street-level honesty have been praised by other writers including Clive Barker, Peter Straub, Roger Zelazny, Marc Laidlaw, and A. A. Attanasio. His more surreal work, as in A Splendid Chaos, showed how it was possible to describe the indescribable with a paradoxical believability and impeccable internal logic no matter how bizarre the subject matter. Shirley's personal experiences as a recovering drug addict and punk rocker brought verisimilitude to his darker, urban-tinctured writing.

In recent years Shirley has written a number of "tie-in novels" and novelizations, including Constantine, based on the Keanu Reaves movie, the best-seller BioShock: Rapture (Tor, 2011), a novel providing a prequel to the BioShock video game story, and Halo: Broken Circle. He also wrote the apocalyptic, politically charged novel, The Other End which, according to the author's website, takes the apocalypse away from the Christian Right and gives Judgment Day to Liberals to do with as they please. This reflects Shirley's tendency to create fantasy entertainment which is also political satire, or spiritual allegory. E.g., Demons, in which it is discovered that industry has deliberately caused deaths by cancer as part of a vast secret program of human sacrifice.

2007 saw the release of a new story collection, Living Shadows, from Prime Books. His novel of dark urban fantasy set in a slightly futuristic New York, Bleak History, was published by Simon & Schuster/Pocket Books in 2009. In August 2011 Underland Press published In Extremis: The Most Extreme Stories of John Shirley and in January 2012 Prime Books published his near future apocalyptic political allegory, the novel Everything Is Broken. His novel about Arthur Conan Doyle in the afterlife, Doyle After Death, was released by HarperCollins/Witness in October 2013. Shirley's apocalyptic and surreal novel High, based on his early novel Three-Ring Psychus, has been re-released by Start Books as an e-book; His newest story collection is 'Feverish Stars (March 2020). In June 2020 his fantasy novel Sorcerer of Atlantis will be released by Hippocampus.

Shirley's work ranges in tone from the surreal to the grittily naturalistic to the nightmarish. He is also a songwriter and singer, having fronted numerous punk bands, including the New York City band Obsession, who were recorded by Celluloid Records. He has written lyrics for Blue Öyster Cult, such as several songs on the album Heaven Forbid.

In 2013 Black October Records released a two-CD compilation of John Shirley's own recordings, Broken Mirror Glass: The John Shirley Anthology – 1978–2012 ...In 2020 Reprehensible Records released the rock albumThe Screaming Geezers; vocals and lyrics by John Shirley. Shirley performs regularly in the Portland, Oregon rock scene.

2014 saw the release of Shirley's first historical novel, Wyatt in Wichita, a novel of the young Wyatt Earp.

Other recent novels are Halo: Broken Circle, Doyle After Death and a novelization of Mark Tremonti's science-fiction rock opera, A Dying Machine.

Shirley is a member of the satirical "religion" Church of the SubGenius.

Awards
John Shirley received several nominations and won the following awards.

Bram Stoker Awards – for horror works, voted by Horror Writers Association professional membership (2 nominations; 1 win)
 1999: "What Would You Do For Love?" (Black Butterflies: A Flock on the Dark Side) – long fiction – nomination
 1999: Black Butterflies: A Flock on the Dark Side (Mark V. Ziesing) – collection – winner
Locus Awards – for science fiction, fantasy and horror works, polled by readers of Locus Magazine (5 nominations)
 1990: Heatseeker (Scream/Press) – collection – 10th place
2000: Really, Really, Really, Weird Stories (Night Shade Books) – collection – 17th place
International Horror Guild Awards – for horror works, juried (6 nominations; 2 wins)
 1998: "Cram" (Wetbones #2) – short story – winner
 1999: Black Butterflies: A Flock on the Dark Side (Mark V. Ziesing) – collection —winner
 1999: "What Would You Do For Love?" (Black Butterflies: A Flock on the Dark Side) – long fiction – nomination
2001: Demons (Cemetery Dance) – long story – nomination
 2002: "Her Hunger" (Night Visions 10) – long fiction – nomination
 2004: Crawlers (Del Rey) – novel – nomination
Interzone Readers Poll – for stories published in Interzone magazine, polled by readers (1 nomination)
2014: "The Kindest Man in Stormland" (Interzone #249) – story – 8th place

Selected works

Novels
 Transmaniacon (1979)
 Dracula in Love (1979)
 City Come A-Walkin' (1980)
 Three-Ring Psychus (1980)
 The Brigade (1981)
 Cellars (1982)
 Several books in the Traveler series of post-apocalyptic men's adventure novels (as D. B. Drumm)
 Several books in the Specialist series of mercenary/adventure men's adventure novels (as John Cutter)
 A Song Called Youth Series (also known as Eclipse Trilogy):
 Eclipse (1985)
 Eclipse Penumbra (1988)
 Eclipse Corona (1990)
 In Darkness Waiting (1988)
 Kamus of Kadizar: The Black Hole of Carcosa (1988)
 A Splendid Chaos (1988)
 Wetbones (1991). A supernatural serial killer novel featuring creatures called the Akishra who take over human minds and bodies.
 Silicon Embrace (1996)
 Demons (2000, novella)
 "...And the Angel with Television Eyes" (2001, novella)
 The View From Hell (2001, novella)
 Her Hunger (2001, novella)
 Spider Moon (2002)
 Demons, a new version with sequel novel Undercurrents (2002)
 Crawlers (2003)
 Doom (2005, novelization of the film version of the Id Software computer game)
 Constantine (2005, novelisation of the film featuring the DC/Vertigo comicbook character)
 John Constantine, Hellblazer: War Lord (2006, based on the comic book character, not the movie version)
 Predator: Forever Midnight (2006, Predator series tie-in)
 Batman: Dead White (2006)
 John Constantine, Hellblazer: Subterranean (2006)
 The Other End (2007)
 Alien: Steel Egg (2007)
 Black Glass (2008)
 Bleak History (2009)
 BioShock: Rapture (2011)
 Borderlands: The Fallen (2011)
 Everything Is Broken (2011)
 Borderlands: Unconquered (2012)
 Resident Evil: Retribution (2012, novelisation of the film version of the Capcom video game)
 Doyle After Death (2013)
 Borderlands: Gunsight (2013)
 Wyatt in Wichita   (2014)
 Grimm: The Icy Touch (2013)
 Watch Dogs //n/Dark Clouds (2013)
 Halo: Broken Circle (2014)
 A Dying Machine (2018, a collaboration with Mark Tremonti of the Tremonti, incorporating ideas found in album of the same name. The novel is co-written by Mark Tremonti)
 Stormland (2021), a science fiction climate-change thriller.
 A Sorcerer of Atlantis (2021), a heroic fantasy novel.

Short story collections
Heatseeker (1989)
New Noir (1993)
The Exploded Heart (1996)
Black Butterflies (1998)
Really, Really, Really, Really Weird Stories (1999)
Darkness Divided (2001)
Living Shadows (2007)
In Extremis: The Most Extreme Short Stories of John Shirley (2011)
 The Feverish Stars (2021)

Anthologies
Freezone (Rock On: The Greatest Hits of Science Fiction & Fantasy, Prime Books 2012)
Meerga (Altered States, Indie Authors Press, 2014)

Nonfiction
Gurdjieff – An Introduction to his Life and Ideas (2004)

Screenwriting credits

Television
Defenders of the Earth (1986)
The Real Ghostbusters (1987)
BraveStarr (1987-1988)
RoboCop (1988)
Star Trek: Deep Space Nine (1995) 
VR.5 (1995)
Poltergeist: The Legacy (1996)
The Adventures of Sinbad (1996)
Todd McFarlane’s Spawn (1998)
The Night of the Headless Horseman (1999)
Batman Beyond (2000)
Profit (2002)
Iron Man: Armored Adventures (2012)
Teenage Mutant Ninja Turtles (2014-2016)

Films
 The Crow (1994)
 Twists of Terror (1997)

Music
John Shirley wrote most of the lyrics for Blue Öyster Cult albums Heaven Forbid and Curse of the Hidden Mirror as well as the songs "Demon's Kiss" and "The Horsemen Arrive" from their soundtrack Bad Channels, and five songs from their 2020 album The Symbol Remains.  Their 1972 song "Transmaniacon MC" was the inspiration for Shirley's first novel, Transmaniacon.

John Shirley's current band, which performs in and around Portland, Oregon, is called The Screaming Geezers.

See also
List of horror fiction authors
Splatterpunk

References

Further reading 
BioShock: Rapture, by John Shirley (2011) 
 R.F. Paul. "The Head Underneath: An Interview with John Shirley". Esoterra: The Journal of Extreme Culture'' No 4 (Winter/Spring 1994), 3–6.

External links
 
 "Piper at the Gates of Hell: An Interview with Cyberpunk Legend John Shirley"
 

1953 births
Living people
20th-century American novelists
21st-century American novelists
American male novelists
American male screenwriters
American science fiction writers
American horror writers
Splatterpunk
Cyberpunk writers
American lyricists
American rock singers
Songwriters from Texas
Writers from the San Francisco Bay Area
American male short story writers
20th-century American short story writers
21st-century American short story writers
20th-century American male writers
21st-century American male writers
Screenwriters from California
American SubGenii